Shotaro Kaneda may refer to:

Shotaro Kaneda (Akira)
Shotaro Kaneda from Tetsujin 28-go